Limestone Township is located in Peoria County, Illinois. As of the 2010 census, its population was 19,705 and it contained 8,103 housing units.

History
Limestone Township was named from the abundance of limestone and attendant lime kilns in the area.

Geography

Demographics

References

External links
City-data.com
Illinois State Archives

Townships in Peoria County, Illinois
Peoria metropolitan area, Illinois
Townships in Illinois